Cowell is a former unincorporated community now annexed to Concord in Contra Costa County, California. It lies at an elevation of 259 feet (79 m).

Cowell was named for Joshua Cowell, local landowner. A post office operated at Cowell from 1922 to 1969. Cowell was a company town for Cowell Portland Cement.  Other than a former firehouse, nothing remains of the former town, which was replaced by the Walnut Country subdivision, more commonly known as "The Crossings," during the 1970s.  A looming, dormant 244-foot high smokestack remained as the most prominent reminder of Cowell until it was demolished in 2009.

References

Concord, California
Neighborhoods in Contra Costa County, California
Company towns in California